Greenwood Valley is an ice-filled valley at the west side of Wilson Piedmont Glacier, lying between Staeffler Ridge and Mount Doorly in Victoria Land, Antarctica. It was named by the Advisory Committee on Antarctic Names for Russell A. Greenwood, U.S. Navy, who was in charge of heavy equipment maintenance at McMurdo Station, 1962.

Further reading
 R. Bargagly, Trace Metals in Antarctica Related to Climate Change and Increasing Human Impact, Reviews of Environmental Contamination and Toxicology 166, P 151

References

Valleys of Victoria Land
Scott Coast